Michael Gray may refer to:

Sportspeople
Mike Gray (Canadian football) (born 1960), Canadian Football League player
Michael Gray (footballer) (born 1974), English footballer

Others
Michael Gray (DJ) (born 1966), British DJ and house music producer
Michael Gray (actor) (born 1951), American actor
Michael Gray (author) (born 1946), author of books on popular music, in particular Bob Dylan
Michael Gray (British Army officer) (1932–2011)
Michael Gray (game designer), American game designer
Michael John Gray (born 1976), Arkansas politician
Mike Gray (1935–2013), American screenwriter
Mike Wingate Gray (1921–1995), British Army officer
Michael Gray, character in Peaky Blinders

See also
Michael Joaquin Grey (born 1961), American artist, inventor, and toy designer